The Band of Angels was the first high technology specific angel investment group in the United States. Today the group remains very active with more than 160 members who invest their time and money into high tech startup companies. Band members have founded companies such as Cirrus Logic, Symantec, SunPower, National Semiconductor and Logitech, and have been senior executive officers at top Silicon Valley companies including Sun Microsystems, Hewlett Packard, Intel, 3Com and Intuit. Numerous articles have been written about the Band, appearing in periodicals such as The New York Times, The Washington Post, The Wall Street Journal, Upside, Red Herring, Der Spiegel, U.S. News & World Report, and Forbes.  The Band has also been featured in two Harvard Business School case studies.

Background
Band members invest in deals directly; there is no pooling of resources or voting. Since 1994, Band members have invested over $186 million into over 200 startup companies. Thirteen deals that presented to the Band as seed investments became public companies; these alone returned $240M in cash to Band members and 63 other companies in the Band's portfolio have been acquired for a gain.  Assuming an exit at lock-up expiration, this corresponds to a 53% annualized internal rate of return (IRR).

The Band of Angels is active, investing in 16-22 deals per year as well as many follow-on pro rata investments into current portfolio companies. It consistently ranks among the top 10 most active VCs in the annual listing of the top 100 by Entrepreneur Magazine. The Band specializes in diverse, early-stage venture investing. The portfolio is distributed among biotech, semiconductor, networking, telecom, medical device, enterprise software, Internet, high-tech services, and even industrial, companies. Every investment receives active post-deal participation from a Band member, including joining the board of directors where possible.

Securing funding from the Band is competitive. Approximately 50 deals submit each month for funding from the group.  Every deal that submits is reviewed and analyzed by 6 domain experts; the top ten companies that apply each month are invited in to an in person interview and the best three from this group are then invited to present at the next available Band dinner. Typically, the odds of being funded after presenting to the Band is 1/3.

The Band was founded by J. C. Hans Severiens and the current chairman is Dr. Ian Sobieski.

In 2004 The Angel Capital Association established the Hans Severiens Award to recognize one person each year for outstanding accomplishments in the advancement of angel investing.

See also
Glen McLaughlin

References

External links
 Clavier Blog Article

Venture capital firms of the United States
Companies based in Menlo Park, California